The Standard Life Assurance Company of Canada (also known as Standard Life) was an investment, retirement and financial protection company and is now part of Manulife Financial.

History
Standard Life first established a presence in Canada through John George Irvine, who took an agency in Quebec in 1834.
Spencer Campbell Thomson, son of the manager of the Standard Life Assurance Company, visited Canada in 1882 and approved a new Canadian head office in St James Street.

On January 30, 2015, the Canadian operations of Standard Life plc joined Manulife.

References

External links

Defunct insurance companies of Canada
Companies based in Montreal
Financial services companies established in 1833
Financial services companies disestablished in 2016
1833 establishments in Canada
2016 mergers and acquisitions
2016 disestablishments in Quebec